The 1950 Colorado A&M Aggies football team represented Colorado State College of Agriculture and Mechanic Arts in the Skyline Conference during the 1950 college football season.  In their fourth season under head coach Bob Davis, the Aggies compiled a 6–3 record (4–1 against Skyline opponents), finished second in the Skyline Conference, and outscored all opponents by a total of 215 to 141.

Four Colorado Agricultural players received all-conference honors in 1950: guard Dale Dodrill, tackle Frank McKiben, halfback Jack Christiansen, and tackle Cliff Hoelzer. Christiansen later played eight seasons as a safety and return specialist with the Detroit Lions and was inducted into the Pro Football Hall of Fame. Dodrill played nine seasons as a defensive tackle with the Pittsburgh Steelers.

Schedule

References

Colorado AandM
Colorado State Rams football seasons
Colorado AandM Aggies football